Fred Hassan (born November 12, 1945), is a Pakistan-born American business executive who works for Warburg Pincus and was CEO of three global pharmaceutical companies.

Early life 
Hassan was born in Multan, a British Raj city now in Punjab, Pakistan. He is the son of Syed Fida Hassan, a Pakistani statesman who also served as Pakistan's ambassador to India. His mother was Zeenat Hassan, a women's rights advocate.

In 1967, Hassan graduated with a bachelor's degree in chemical engineering from Imperial College London. After working in the fertilizer industry with an affiliate of the Delaware-based company Hercules Inc., he enrolled at Harvard and obtained an MBA in 1972. He married Noreen Shah in 1969. They have three children and three grandchildren.

Career

1972–1989 

Hassan was hired by Sandoz, an R+D-based global pharmaceutical company (which later became Novartis, after merging with Ciba-Geigy in 1996), while he was still finishing his MBA at Harvard. Eleven years later, he was asked to turn around the largest operating unit, Sandoz US. During the 80s, Sandoz pioneered its move into immunology, starting first with transplantation (cyclosporine) and later with innovations in cancer. In 1989, he was recruited by American Home Products (AHP)to run their pharmaceutical operation out of Radnor, Pennsylvania.

1989–1997 
Hassan played an important role in helping transform AHP, later renamed Wyeth (WYE) from a multi-industry conglomerate to a focused, research and development-driven, health care company incorporating, consumer health care, veterinary, medical devices, and with the Wyeth global pharmaceutical business at its core. In 1991, Hassan company hired Robert Levy, formerly head of the Heart, Lung and Blood Institute at the National Institutes of Health, to lead its research and development team. Wyeth (WYE), entered into the biotechnology field by buying Genetics Institute in 1991. The company also acquired A.H. Robins in 1989 and American Cyanamid in 1994 to strengthen its global operations. Important innovations (individual blockbuster products with annual sales of over a billion dollars) including Effexor (anti-depressant), Protonix (a proton pump inhibitor for heartburn), Prevnar (a vaccine to prevent ear infections), and Enbrel an anti-inflammatory, and the first powerful biotech to help with joint inflammation in rheumatoid arthritis, came out of these strengthened operations. In 1997, Hassan was asked to take over as CEO of the then failing merger of Pharmacia & Upjohn (PNU).

1997–2000 

As CEO of Pharmacia and Upjohn (PNU), Hassan made many changes, including moving its headquarters from the UK to New Jersey. The New York Times called this the "Fred Factor: investors' belief that the man who masterminded American Home Products' ascension can do an encore." Fifteen months after Hassan took charge, the Wall Street Journal ran an article titled "Turnaround becomes a reality at Pharmacia and Upjohn". PNU acquired the pre-revenue cancer company Sugen in 1999 for $650 million, which subsequently yielded Sutent, a billion dollar product. In 2000, PNU completed a mega-merger with Monsanto (MON) to become Pharmacia (PHA). In the three years leading to Hassan's next CEO assignment, as head of PHA, PNU's stock value had morphed from $15 billion to $52 billion.

2000–2003 
As CEO, and later as chairman and CEO of Pharmacia (PHA), Hassan oversaw the establishment of Celebrex as a large product for pain and inflammation, and the carve-out, followed by a successful initial public offering of the agricultural business under the name "Monsanto" (MON). Monsanto (MON) saw major value expansion and was subsequently acquired by Bayer for $62.5 billion. In July 2002, Pfizer approached PHA with a 44 percent premium and a $62 billion merger was announced. Shortly after the merger closed in April 2003, Hassan took over as chairman and CEO of Schering Plough (SGP), then a struggling pharmaceutical company.

2003–2009 

As chairman and CEO of Schering Plough (SGP), Hassan oversaw the resolution of multiple legacy legal, regulatory, research and development and operational challenges and was able to declare a company turnaround by 2005. Products, including Nasonex (allergies), Remicade (inflammation), Temodar (brain cancer), OTC Claritin (allergies), OTC Miralax (laxative), grew strongly in the marketplace. In 2007, Schering Plough acquired Organon, a Dutch company and successful innovations came from Organon's research and development, including Keytruda (cancer), Implanon (long acting contraception) and Bridion (faster recovery from anesthesia). Keytruda,the product from Organon R&D, and acquired by Schering Plough, is expected to become the largest pharmaceutical product in the world by 2024 at an annualized level of $24 billion in sales. In late 2009, Schering Plough merged with Merck & Co (MRK), and Hassan left for Warburg Pincus (WP), a private equity company in New York City. "During Fred's tenure of six and a half years, Schering Plough's stock rose 62 percent, versus a drop of 21 percent for the unweighted basket of six peers."

2009–present 
Hassan has played varying roles at Warburg Pincus, including as a Partner and Managing Director. He served as chairman of Bausch and Lomb until its sale to Valeant in August 2013. Hassan served as board member of Time Warner from 2009 until its sale to AT&T in June 2018. As of June 2019, he was a board member of Amgen(AMGN) (biotech), Intrexon(XON) now Precigen(PGEN) (synthetic biology), Modernizing Medicine (Electronic Medical Records), and as of August 31, 2021, was also board member of BridgeBio, Prometheus Biosciences, and chairman of Theramex (a global women's health company, headquartered in London, UK).

Hassan has been chairman of Caret Group of companies under the umbrella headline “Powered by nature... perfected by science™ .” The 4 marketed non-prescription products are IBgard® (for IBS (Irritable Bowel Syndrome)), FDgard® (for Functional Dyspepsia (Recurring Indigestion)), Fiber Choice® (daily prebiotic chewable fiber) and REMfresh® (advanced non-drug formulation for 7 hour sleep support)). All products are carried by thousands retail stores and are also available online. All four brands were acquired by Nestle Health Science on September 1, 2020.

Achievements 
In 1997, Hassan founded Community Hope which helps challenged individuals, especially veterans, to overcome or manage mental health issues and, where possible, lead a purposeful and stable life. As of 2021, 17 million dollars had been raised to further the organization's goals.

As chairman of the Pharmaceutical Research and Manufacturers Association (PhRMA) (from 2002 to 2003) and president of the International Federation of Pharmaceutical Associations (IFPMA) (from 2006 to 2009), Hassan led initiatives on voluntary guidelines for promotional practices and for fuller disclosure of clinical trials. In 2003, Hassan participated in work leading to the Medicare prescription drug benefit (Part D). He worked inside the PhRMA board to start patient assistance programs, and in New Jersey, received appreciation from the Health Care Institute of New Jersey for expediting Rx4NJ in 2006.

He was one of PhRMA's top team members who worked on the Affordable Care Act in 2009.

In 2008, he was asked to be on the "CEO of the Year" Selection Committee by the CEO Group and remains a member.

In 2012, Hassan was the founding participant of RDL (Research & Development Leadership) summit as an ongoing annual forum for Life Sciences R&D leaders, CEOs, and industry specialists, to gather and discuss R&D productivity, innovations and access to medicines.

In 2012 Hassan co-founded "The CEO Forum" with Accenture. In this annual forum, Life Sciences CEOs come together and discuss management strategies. These CEOs typically include those from the highest market capitalization companies in Global Pharmas, Insurance, Global Med Tech, Global online and retail operators, Contract Development and Manufacturing Organizations, and Consumer Health Care Companies.

Companies whose leaders have attended these include Bayer Pharma, Bristol Myers Squibb, Cigna Espress Scripts, CVS Caremark Aetna, Lilly, Merck, Nestle Health Science, Novartis, Pfizer, United Health, and Walgreens Alliance Boots.

Since 1987, Hassan has been frequently sought by media companies to comment on various events on TV and on other platforms. In 2020, he appeared 9 times on TV in this regard.

In July 2021, Hassan was asked by his alma mater Imperial College of Science, Technology and Medicine to do a keynote at the end of its course for entrepreneurs representing multiple countries.

Awards 
 CEO of the Year award, Financial Times (1999)
 50 Best CEO's, Worth (1999)
 America's Best CEO's, Institutional Investor Magazine (2008)
 CEO of the Year, Scrip (2009)
 Most profound impact on the world of business in the previous quarter century, CNBC panel (2014)
 Harvard Business School Healthcare Alumni Ellerin Award (2015)
 "Entrepreneur of the Year" (Florida) (2019)

Articles 
Book: * 2013 – "Reinvent, A Leaders Playbook for Serial Success"

Articles in Harvard Business Review:

 2003 – "In Search of Global Leaders"
 2006 – "Leading Change from the Topline"
 2011 – "The Frontline Advantage"

Other articles 

 2013 – "So You Want to Be a CEO. Start Here", J. Lublin, WSJ 
 2018 – "The big bang is coming to healthcare, and it will speak the next industrial revolution" – CNBC
 2019 – "The Rule of Three" (the concept of distilling lists to the three items that matter most); Fred Hassan, CEO Magazine
 2020 – The Arc of Leadership, JP Donlon, NACD Directorship Magazine (September/October) The pictures of the 4 CEOs in the print edition mentioned Mr. Harold S. Geneen ("strict central control leader"), Mr. Welch ("value enhancer and Neutron Jack"), Mr. Mullaly ("executed Ford turnaround") and Mr. Hassan ("Innovation CEO")
 2020 – "Modern Bioscience Has Risen to the Challenge. Now It's Our Turn"; Chief Executive Magazine, Fred Hassan
 2020 - "White Paper - How Biopharma Commercial and R&D Can Partner to Accelerate Digital Innovation"; Bright Insight
 2021 – "Carlyle, Warburg join $123m series D round in Chinese biotech firm Abbisko"; Tech in Asia, Miguel Cordon "'Warburg Pincus, with a long history of investing in life sciences globally, will leverage its network to help the company to accelerate global partnership and global clinical development,' Fred Hassan, a board member of American biopharmaceutical company Amgen, commented on behalf of Warburg Pincus."
 2021 - "Digital Transformation: A Journey, Not Just a Destination"; Michael Wong, Pharmaceutical Executive Digital
 2021 - "Why Bioscience Will Increasingly Call The Plays", Fred Hassan & Göran Ando, Life Science Leader
 2021 - "Fred Hassan Proves Big Pharma Can Have A Big Heart", IBTimes

Philanthropy 

Fred Hassan Orangerie – Farleigh Dickenson University, New Jersey: 2014

Newark Academy Sports Center; New Jersey:2003

Patents 
Being an innovation oriented business leader, Fred Hassan has an extensive record of patents. The USPTO lists these patents (already granted as well as pending).

References 

Alumni of Imperial College London
American health care chief executives
Businesspeople in the pharmaceutical industry
Harvard Business School alumni
Living people
Schering-Plough
1945 births
Pakistani emigrants to the United States
American people of Pakistani descent